This article provides information on candidates who stood for the 1922 Australian federal election. The election was held on 16 December 1922.

By-elections, appointments and defections

By-elections and appointments
On 10 July 1920, Charles McGrath (Labor) was elected to succeed Edwin Kerby (Nationalist) as the member for Ballaarat, after the latter's election in 1919 was declared void.
On 18 December 1920, George Foley (Nationalist) was elected to succeed Hugh Mahon (Labor) as the member for Kalgoorlie following the latter's expulsion from the House.
On 16 February 1921, Edward Vardon (Nationalist) was appointed as a South Australian Senator to succeed Robert Guthrie (Nationalist).
On 30 July 1921, James Hunter (Country) was elected to succeed Jim Page (Labor) as the member for Maranoa.
On 3 September 1921, William Lambert (Labor) was elected to succeed T. J. Ryan (Labor) as the member for West Sydney.
On 10 December 1921, Herbert Pratten (Nationalist) was elected to succeed Sir Joseph Cook (Nationalist) as the member for Parramatta.
On 15 December 1921, Henry Garling (Nationalist) was appointed as a New South Wales Senator to succeed Herbert Pratten (Nationalist).
On 18 February 1922, James Scullin (Labor) was elected to succeed Frank Tudor (Labor) as the member for Yarra.
On 26 May 1922, John MacDonald (Labor) was appointed as a Queensland Senator to succeed John Adamson (Nationalist).

Defections
In 1920, Labor MP William Higgs (Capricornia) was expelled from the Labor Party. After a period as an Independent, he joined the Nationalist Party later that year.
In 1920, the Australian Country Party was formed by the various state organisations. It was also joined by a number of Nationalist MPs: Llewellyn Atkinson (Wilmot), William Fleming (Robertson), Henry Gregory (Dampier), Alexander Hay (New England), Edmund Jowett (Echuca) and William McWilliams (Franklin).
In 1922, Nationalists disaffected with Prime Minister Billy Hughes's leadership formed the Liberal Party. It was joined by Nationalists Richard Foster (Wakefield), William Watt (Balaclava), Senator James Rowell (South Australia) and Senator Edward Vardon (South Australia).
In 1922, Country MP Alexander Hay (New England) was expelled from the party. He sat as an Independent.
In 1922, Independent MP Frederick Francis (Henty) joined the Nationalist Party.
In 1922, Labor MP James Catts (Cook) was expelled from the party. He contested the election for the Majority Labor Party.

Redistributions and seat changes
Redistributions of electoral boundaries occurred in all states.
In New South Wales, the Independent-held seat of Barrier and the Nationalist-held seats of Illawarra and Nepean were abolished. Four new seats were created: Barton, Martin and Warringah were notionally Nationalist, and Reid was notionally Labor.
The member for Barrier, Michael Considine (Industrial Socialist Labor), contested Darling.
The member for Illawarra, Hector Lamond (Nationalist), contested Barton.
The member for Nepean, Eric Bowden (Nationalist), contested Parramatta.
The member for North Sydney, Sir Granville Ryrie (Nationalist), contested Warringah. (See also Victoria below.)
The member for Parramatta, Herbert Pratten (Nationalist), contested Martin.
In Victoria, the Country-held seat of Grampians was abolished.
The member for Bendigo, Prime Minister Billy Hughes (Nationalist), contested the New South Wales seat of North Sydney.
The member for Grampians, Edmund Jowett (Country), contested Bendigo.
In Queensland, the Nationalist-held seat of Brisbane became notionally Labor.
In Western Australia, the Country-held seat of Dampier was abolished. One new seat, Forrest (notionally Country), was created.
The member for Dampier, Henry Gregory (Country), contested Swan.
The member for Swan, John Prowse (Country), contested Forrest.
There were minimal changes in South Australia and Tasmania.
A new seat was created for the Northern Territory.

Retiring Members and Senators

Nationalist
 Reginald Burchell MP (Fremantle, WA)
 John Livingston MP (Barker, SA)
 Arnold Wienholt MP (Moreton, Qld)
Senator George Fairbairn (Vic)

House of Representatives
Sitting members at the time of the election are shown in bold text. Successful candidates are highlighted in the relevant colour. Where there is possible confusion, an asterisk (*) is also used.

New South Wales

Northern Territory

Queensland

South Australia

Tasmania

Victoria

Western Australia

Senate
Sitting Senators are shown in bold text. Tickets that elected at least one Senator are highlighted in the relevant colour. Successful candidates are identified by an asterisk (*).

New South Wales
Three seats were up for election. The Nationalist Party was defending three seats. Labor Senator Albert Gardiner and Nationalist Senators Charles Cox and Walter Duncan were not up for re-election.

Queensland
Four seats were up for election. One of these was a short-term vacancy caused by Nationalist Senator John Adamson's death; this seat had been filled in the interim by Labor's John MacDonald. The Nationalist Party was defending four seats. Nationalist Senators Thomas Givens and Sir William Glasgow were not up for re-election.

South Australia
Three seats were up for election. The Nationalist Party was defending three seats. Nationalist Senators Benjamin Benny, John Newland and Victor Wilson were not up for re-election.

Tasmania
Three seats were up for election. The Nationalist Party was defending three seats. Nationalist Senators George Foster, John Millen and Herbert Payne were not up for re-election.

Victoria
Three seats were up for election. The Nationalist Party was defending three seats. Nationalist Senators Harold Elliott, James Guthrie and Edward Russell were not up for re-election.

Western Australia
Three seats were up for election. The Nationalist Party was defending three seats. Nationalist Senators Edmund Drake-Brockman, Patrick Lynch and George Pearce were not up for re-election.

See also
 1922 Australian federal election
 Members of the Australian House of Representatives, 1919–1922
 Members of the Australian House of Representatives, 1922–1925
 Members of the Australian Senate, 1920–1923
 Members of the Australian Senate, 1923–1926
 List of political parties in Australia

References
Adam Carr's Election Archive - House of Representatives 1922
Adam Carr's Election Archive - Senate 1922

1922 elections in Australia
Candidates for Australian federal elections